Jean Marlin (1833–1872) was a non-commissioned officer, a sergeant of the French 8th Battalion of infantry.  He was a member of the first French military mission to Japan in 1867, in which he accompanied Jules Brunet. He worked as an instructor for infantry in the army of the Tokugawa shogunate.

With the advent of the Boshin War, and the declaration of neutrality of foreign powers, Marlin chose to resign from the French Army and continue the fight on the side of the  shōgun. After the shogunate fell he joined the Republic of Ezo along with Brunet and other French defectors.

After the war he returned to France. In 1871, along with fellow officers of the 1867 mission, François Bouffier and Arthur Fortant, Marlin returned to Japan to work as an instructor at the military school of Osaka, this time as a civilian. He died in Japan of an illness in April 1872, and was buried at the Yokohama International cemetery.

Notes

References 
 Polak, Christian. (2001). Soie et lumières: L'âge d'or des échanges franco-japonais (des origines aux années 1950). Tokyo: Chambre de Commerce et d'Industrie Française du Japon, Hachette Fujin Gahōsha (アシェット婦人画報社).
 __. (2002). 絹と光: 知られざる日仏交流100年の歴史 (江戶時代-1950年代) Kinu to hikariō: shirarezaru Nichi-Futsu kōryū 100-nen no rekishi (Edo jidai-1950-nendai). Tokyo: Ashetto Fujin Gahōsha, 2002. ; 

French soldiers
1833 births
1872 deaths
People of the Boshin War
French emigrants to Japan